João Sayad (1 December 1945 – 5 September 2021) was a Brazilian economist, professor of the Department of Economics, Management and Accounting of the University of Sao Paulo and a Secretary of Finance for the state of Sao Paulo. He was awarded a PhD in economics by Yale University in New Haven, Connecticut. Sayad was also once president and chairman of the board of directors of the Inter-American Development Bank in São Paulo and director of the Economic Research Institute Foundation at the University of São Paulo.

Political views
Sayad was described by the Brazilian magazine Época in an interview as an academic who holds eclectic views on politics and economics. He is known for his analyzing of the economic dispute between the Keynesians and the Monetarists, allegedly not taking a specific bias toward either side. Sayad has many times discussed and commented on the current political crisis surrounding Dilma Rousseff and the Workers' Party, along with its impact on the economy of the country. He has been described as a "skeptical" in regards to the promises alleged by the current Brazilian government and its capacity to manage the current state of the economy.

Bibliography

References

External links
Interview (in Portuguese) 

1945 births
2021 deaths
Brazilian economists
University of São Paulo alumni
Yale University alumni